In mathematical logic, Diaconescu's theorem, or the Goodman–Myhill theorem, states that the full axiom of choice is sufficient to derive the law of the excluded middle, or restricted forms of it, in constructive set theory. It was discovered in 1975 by Radu Diaconescu and later by Goodman and Myhill. Already in 1967, Errett Bishop posed the theorem as an exercise (Problem 2 on page 58 in Foundations of constructive analysis).

Proof 

For any proposition , we can build the sets
  
and
  

These are sets, using the axiom of specification. In classical set theory this would be equivalent to 
  
However, without the law of the excluded middle, these equivalences cannot be proven; in fact the two sets are not even provably finite (in the usual sense of being in bijection with a natural number, though they would be in the Dedekind sense). 

Assuming the axiom of choice, there exists a choice function for the set ; that is, a function  such that 

 

By the definition of the two sets, this means that

 , 

which implies 

But since  (by the axiom of extensionality), therefore , so

 

Thus  As this could be done for any proposition, this completes the proof that the axiom of choice implies the law of the excluded middle. 

The proof relies on the use of the full separation axiom. In constructive set theories with only the predicative separation, the form of P will be restricted to sentences with bound quantifiers only, giving only a restricted form of the law of the excluded middle. This restricted form is still not acceptable constructively.

In constructive type theory, or in Heyting arithmetic extended with finite types, there is typically no separation at all—subsets of a type are given different treatments. A form of the axiom of choice is a theorem, yet excluded middle is not.

Notes 

Constructivism (mathematics)
Set theory
Axiom of choice